Osterburken is a town in the Neckar-Odenwald district, in Baden-Württemberg, Germany. It is situated 28 km southwest of Tauberbischofsheim, 50 km northeast of Heilbronn, 90 km east of Heidelberg, 60 km southwest of Würzburg and 30 km east of Mosbach. The S1 S-Bahn line of VRN public transport service operates between Homburg (Saarland) and Osterburken, hence the train station here is used frequently to transfer to and from other trains.

References

Neckar-Odenwald-Kreis